Divčići is a village in the municipalities of Trnovo, Republika Srpska and Trnovo FBIH, Bosnia and Herzegovina.

Demographics 
According to the 2013 census, its population was nil.

References

Populated places in Trnovo, Sarajevo
Populated places in Trnovo, Republika Srpska